Elmont may refer to:

Places
In the United States
Elmont, Missouri
Elmont, New York
Elmont station, a Long Island Rail Road station in Elmont, New York
Elmont, Virginia

Fictional people
Elmont (Doonesbury), a character in the Doonesbury comic strip

People with the surname
Dex Elmont (born 1984), Dutch judoka
Ilonka Elmont, Surinamese-Dutch mixed martial artist